Rait Maruste (born 27 September 1953, in Pärnu) is an Estonian former judge, legal scholar and politician. He has been member of IX, X, XI and XII Riigikogu.

From 1992 until 1998 he was Chief Justice of the Supreme Court of Estonia.

He is a member of Estonian Reform Party.

References

1953 births
Living people
20th-century Estonian judges
Estonian legal scholars
Estonian Reform Party politicians
Members of the Riigikogu, 1999–2003
Members of the Riigikogu, 2011–2015
Members of the Riigikogu, 2015–2019
Recipients of the Order of the White Star, 2nd Class
University of Tartu alumni
Academic staff of the University of Tartu
People from Pärnu